"The Way It Used to Be" is a song recorded by Engelbert Humperdinck, which was released on the album Engelbert and as a single in 1969. It is an English language adaptation of the Italian language song "Melodia", which was originally released by Isabella Iannetti in 1968.

The song was a top ten hit in multiple countries, and spent 14 weeks on the UK Singles Chart, peaking at No. 3, while reaching No. 1 in Flanders and Singapore, No. 3 in Malaysia, No. 5 in Yugoslavia, No. 6 on the Irish Singles Chart, No. 7 on Norway's VG-lista, No. 7 in Wallonia, and No. 9 in South Africa. The song was a hit in other nations as well.

In the United States, the song spent 11 weeks on the Billboard Hot 100 chart, peaking at No. 42, while reaching No. 4 on Billboards Easy Listening chart. The song was ranked No. 26 on Billboards year-end ranking of 1969's "Top Easy Listening Singles".

Chart performance

Other versions
 An instrumental version was released by Bert Kaempfert & His Orchestra, on his 1969 album Traces of Love.
 Fredi released a Finnish language adaptation titled "Se päivä tulee kerran" in 1969, which reached No. 2 in Finland.
 Jimmy Fontana released a version of "Melodia" in 1969, which bubbled under the top 50 in Wallonia.
 Milyo Naryo released a Tagalog language adaptation titled "Naka-Table Na Kita".

References

1969 songs
1969 singles
Decca Records singles
Parrot Records singles
Engelbert Humperdinck songs
Songs written by Roger Cook (songwriter)
Songs written by Roger Greenaway
Number-one singles in Belgium